Sunday Morning with Nat Stuckey and Connie Smith is the second collaborative studio album by American country artists Nat Stuckey and Connie Smith. It was released in January 1970 via RCA Victor and contained 11 tracks. The disc was a collection of country gospel songs performed as duets by both artists. It was the pair's first album of religious music. Among the album's recording was the song "If God Is Dead (Who's That Living in My Soul)". Released as a single, the song charted in the top 60 of the American country chart in 1970. The album received a positive review from Billboard magazine following its release. In 2002, the album was re-released under the title God Will and included a twelfth track.

Background
Nat Stuckey and Connie Smith were signed to the RCA Victor label as solo artists during the 1960s. After first breaking through with the 1966 top five single "Sweet Thang", Nat Stuckey had several more top ten singles with RCA including "Plastic Saddle". In 1964, Connie Smith's career was launched with her debut single called "Once a Day". Spending eight weeks at the top of the American country chart, the song set forth a series of top ten singles during the decade on RCA. The duo first collaborated together in 1969 with the country studio album Young Love. Included on the disc was a cover of the gospel song, "Whispering Hope". The song inspired the creating of a gospel album between the pair. It was also an opportunity for Smith to record more gospel material, after becoming a Christian in 1968 and pushing for more gospel material on recording sessions. "I wanted to do a gospel record at that point, so this was a way to record one," recalled Smith in 2012.

Recording and content
Stuckey and Smith recorded the tracks for Sunday Morning over the course of three days: December 9, December 10 and December 11, 1969. The sessions took place at the RCA Victor Studios, located in Nashville, Tennessee. The recordings were produced by Bob Ferguson and Felton Jarvis. It was the second album project pairing for Ferguson and Jarvis. Both producers had originally paired the performers together in 1969 for their first album. A total of eleven tracks (all recorded as duets) comprised the project. Some of the album's tracks were cover versions of previously recorded country gospel and sacred songs. Among these covers was Johnny Cash's "Daddy Sang Bass". The song was requested by Bob Ferguson to include on the project. Also included was a cover of Cash's "He Turned Water into Wine" and the gospel track "Crumbs from the Table". Other recordings were composed by popular Nashville songwriters such as John D. Loudermilk, Cindy Walker and Marijohn Wilkin.

Release and reception
Sunday Morning with Nat Stuckey and Connie Smith was released in January 1970 on the RCA Victor label. It was the eighth studio album of Stuckey's career and the fifteenth studio album of Smith's. The project was originally issued by the label as a vinyl LP, containing six songs on "side one" and five songs on "side two". According to biographer Barry Mazor, the cover photo was taken "at two completely different times and places by two different photographers" because Smith was involved in a car accident which setback album photos. In February 1970, Billboard magazine gave the album a positive response. "The coupling of Nat Stuckey and Connie Smith in an album of sacred material cannot fail to prove a  powerful lure to country buyers," reviewers commented.

Decades later, the album was re-issued to digital and streaming markets through Sony Music Entertainment.  

Following its original release, there were requests to radio for the album's track "If God Is Dead (Who's That Living in My Soul)". This demand led to RCA Victor releasing the song as a single in February 1970. The song later charted on the American Billboard Hot Country Songs chart, peaking at number 59 in 1970. In 2002, the album was re-released via a compact disc and cassette through the label Music Row Talent Records. However, the album was re-titled with a different cover photo under the name God Will. A total of 12 tracks was included on the disc. The additional twelfth track was the duo's cover of "Whispering Hope", which was pulled from their 1969 Young Love album.

Sunday Morning track listings

Vinyl version

Digital version

God Will track listings

Compact disc and digital versions

Cassette version

Personnel
All credits are taken from the original studio sessions, which are adapted from the biography booklet by Barry Mazor titled Just for What I Am.

Musical personnel
 Joseph Babcock – Background vocals
 Bobby L. Dyson – Bass
 Dolores Edgin – Background vocals
 Kossie Gardner – Organ
 Johnny Gimble – Fiddle
 Buddy Harman – Drums
 Weldon Myrick – Steel guitar, leader
 June Page – Background vocals
 Hargus "Pig" Robbins – Piano
 Billy Sanford – Electric guitar
 Connie Smith – Lead vocals
 Nat Stuckey – Lead vocals
 Pete Wade – Electric guitar
 Hurshel Wiginton – Background vocals
 Chip Young – Rhythm guitar

Technical personnel
 Bob Ferguson – Producer
 Jake Hess – Liner notes
 Felton Jarvis – Producer
 Al Pachucki – Recording engineer
 Roy Shockley – Recording technician

Release history

References

Footnotes

Books

 

1970 albums
Albums produced by Bob Ferguson (music)
Albums produced by Felton Jarvis
Connie Smith albums
Gospel albums by American artists
Nat Stuckey albums
RCA Records albums
Vocal duet albums